Edward Johnstone may refer to:

 Ed Johnstone (born 1954), Canadian ice hockey player
 Edward Huggins Johnstone (1922–2013), American federal judge
 Edward Grahame Johnstone (1899–1946), British World War I flying ace

See also 

 Edward Johnston (disambiguation)
 Ted Johnstone, pseudonym of author David McDaniel